Ma Xiaochun (born 26 August 1964) is a Chinese professional Go player.

Biography 
Ma was born in Zhejiang, China. He began playing Go at the age of nine and was awarded 7 dan rank in 1982. In 1983, Ma was promoted to 9 dan. He visited Japan in 1982 and later won the World Amateur Go Championship in 1983. Ma won the 2nd Mingren title in 1989 and successfully defended it for thirteen straight years, second most behind Cho Hunhyun's sixteen Paewang titles.

Titles and runners-up 
 
Ranks #1 in total number of titles in China.

References 

1964 births
Living people
Chinese Go players
Sportspeople from Shaoxing
People from Shengzhou